Monocacy Station is an unincorporated community in Amity Township in Berks County, Pennsylvania, United States. Monocacy Station is located along North Main Street to the north of the Schuylkill River and east of Birdsboro. Monocacy Station previously had a post office with a ZIP code of 19542; however, this ZIP code was retired in 2016 and the community is now served by the Douglassville ZIP code of 19518.

The community takes its name from Monocacy Creek, which is a Native American name purported to mean "stream with several big bends".

References

Unincorporated communities in Berks County, Pennsylvania
Unincorporated communities in Pennsylvania
Pennsylvania placenames of Native American origin